Below is a list of the 31 members of the European Parliament for the Netherlands in the 1994 to 1999 session.

Party representation

Mutations

1994 
 9 June: Election for the European Parliament in the Netherlands.
 19 July: The Europe of Nations Group (EN) was founded and Reformed Political Party and Reformed Political League join.
 19 July: Begin 4th European Parliament session. (1994–1999)

1996 
 10 November: Europe of Nations Group (EN) dissolves
 2 December: Jim Janssen van Raaij leaves the Christian Democratic Appeal party and continues as an independent.
 20 December: The Independents for a Europe of Nations group (I-EN) was founded and Reformed Political Party, Reformed Political League and Reformatory Political Federation join.

1997 
 1 September: Leen van der Waal (SGP, GPV and RPF) leaves the European Parliament. In his place Rijk van Dam is installed the same day.

1998 
 3 August: Gijs de Vries (VVD) leaves the European Parliament, because he became an undersecretary in the Second Kok cabinet.
 30 September: Robert Jan Goedbloed (VVD) is installed in the European Parliament as a replacement for Gijs de Vries
 1 September: Nel van Dijk (GL) leaves the European Parliament. In her place Joost Lagendijk is installed the same day.

1999 
 8 June: Laurens Jan Brinkhorst (D66) leaves the European Parliament, because he became a minister in the Second Kok cabinet. (no successor was installed, because it's days before the end of this parliament session.)

Alphabetical

| style="text-align:left;" colspan="11" | 
|-
! Name
! Sex
! National party
! EP Group
! Period
! Preference vote
|-
| style="text-align:left; | Hedy d'Ancona
| style="text-align:left; | Female
| style="text-align:left; |  Labour Party
| style="text-align:left; |  PES
| style="text-align:left; | 19 July 1994 – July 1999
| style="text-align:left; | 
|-
| style="text-align:left; | Jan-Willem Bertens
| style="text-align:left; | Male
| style="text-align:left; |  Democrats 66
| style="text-align:left; |  ELDR
| style="text-align:left; | 24 July 1989 – 20 July 1999
| style="text-align:left; | 
|-
| style="text-align:left; | Leonie van Bladel
| style="text-align:left; | Female
| style="text-align:left; |  Labour Party
| style="text-align:left; |  PES
| style="text-align:left; | 19 July 1994 – 20 July 1999
| style="text-align:left; | 
|-
| style="text-align:left; | Hans Blokland
| style="text-align:left; | Male
| style="text-align:left; |  Reformed Political Alliance
| style="text-align:left; |  EN /I-EN
| style="text-align:left; | 19 July 1994 – 14 July 2009
| style="text-align:left; | 
|-
| style="text-align:left; | Johanna Boogerd-Quaak
| style="text-align:left; | Female
| style="text-align:left; |  Democrats 66
| style="text-align:left; |  ELDR
| style="text-align:left; | 5 February 2003 – 20 July 2004
| style="text-align:left; | 
|-
| style="text-align:left; | Laurens Jan Brinkhorst
| style="text-align:left; | Male
| style="text-align:left; |  Democrats 66
| style="text-align:left; |  ELDR
| style="text-align:left; | 19 July 1994 – 8 June 1999
| style="text-align:left; | 
|-
| style="text-align:left; | Frits Castricum
| style="text-align:left; | Male
| style="text-align:left; |  Labour Party
| style="text-align:left; |  PES
| style="text-align:left; | 19 July 1994 – 20 July 1999
| style="text-align:left; | 
|-
| style="text-align:left; | Pam Cornelissen
| style="text-align:left; | Male
| style="text-align:left; |  Christian Democratic Appeal
| style="text-align:left; |  EPP
| style="text-align:left; | 24 July 1984 – 20 July 1999
| style="text-align:left; | 
|-
| style="text-align:left; | Rijk van Dam
| style="text-align:left; | Male
| style="text-align:left; |  Reformatory Political Federation
| style="text-align:left; |  I-EN
| style="text-align:left; | September 1997 – 20 July 2004
| style="text-align:left; | 
|-
| style="text-align:left; | Piet Dankert
| style="text-align:left; | Male
| style="text-align:left; |  Labour Party
| style="text-align:left; |  PES
| style="text-align:left; | 19 July 1994 – 20 July 1999
| style="text-align:left; | 
|-
| style="text-align:left; | Nel van Dijk
| style="text-align:left; | Female
| style="text-align:left; |  GreenLeft
| style="text-align:left; |  G
| style="text-align:left; | January 1987 – 1 September 1998
| style="text-align:left; | 
|-
| style="text-align:left; | Doeke Eisma
| style="text-align:left; | Male
| style="text-align:left; |  Democrats 66
| style="text-align:left; |  ELDR
| style="text-align:left; | 19 July 1994 – 20 July 1999
| style="text-align:left; | 
|-
| style="text-align:left; | Robert Jan Goedbloed
| style="text-align:left; | Male
| style="text-align:left; |  People's Party for Freedom and Democracy
| style="text-align:left; |  ELDR
| style="text-align:left; | September 1998 – 20 July 1999
| style="text-align:left; | 
|-
| style="text-align:left; | Elly Plooij-van Gorsel
| style="text-align:left; | Female
| style="text-align:left; |  People's Party for Freedom and Democracy
| style="text-align:left; |  ELDR
| style="text-align:left; | 19 July 1994 – 20 July 2004
| style="text-align:left; | 
|-
| style="text-align:left; | Joost Lagendijk
| style="text-align:left; | Male
| style="text-align:left; |  GreenLeft
| style="text-align:left; |  G
| style="text-align:left; | 1 September 1998 – 14 July 2009
| style="text-align:left; | 
|-
| style="text-align:left; | Jessica Larive
| style="text-align:left; | Female
| style="text-align:left; |  People's Party for Freedom and Democracy
| style="text-align:left; |  ELDR
| style="text-align:left; | 24 July 1984 – 20 July 1999
| style="text-align:left; | 
|-
| style="text-align:left; | Hanja Maij-Weggen
| style="text-align:left; | Female
| style="text-align:left; |  Christian Democratic Appeal
| style="text-align:left; |  EPP
| style="text-align:left; | 19 July 1994 – 1 October 2003
| style="text-align:left; | 
|-
| style="text-align:left; | Alman Metten
| style="text-align:left; | Male
| style="text-align:left; |  Labour Party
| style="text-align:left; |  PES
| style="text-align:left; | 24 July 1984 – 20 July 1999
| style="text-align:left; | 
|-
| style="text-align:left; | Jan Mulder
| style="text-align:left; | Male
| style="text-align:left; |  People's Party for Freedom and Democracy
| style="text-align:left; |  ELDR
| style="text-align:left; | 19 July 1994 – 14 July 2009 22 June 2010 – 1 July 2014
| style="text-align:left; | 
|-
| style="text-align:left; | Ria Oomen-Ruijten
| style="text-align:left; | Female
| style="text-align:left; |  Christian Democratic Appeal
| style="text-align:left; |  EPP
| style="text-align:left; | 25 July 1989 – 1 July 2014
| style="text-align:left; | 
|-
| style="text-align:left; | Arie Oostlander
| style="text-align:left; | Male
| style="text-align:left; |  Christian Democratic Appeal
| style="text-align:left; |  EPP
| style="text-align:left; | 25 July 1989 – 20 July 2004
| style="text-align:left; | 
|-
| style="text-align:left; | Karla Peijs
| style="text-align:left; | Female
| style="text-align:left; |  Christian Democratic Appeal
| style="text-align:left; |  EPP
| style="text-align:left; | 25 July 1989 – 27 May 2003
| style="text-align:left; | 
|-
| style="text-align:left; | Peter Pex
| style="text-align:left; | Male
| style="text-align:left; |  Christian Democratic Appeal
| style="text-align:left; |  EPP
| style="text-align:left; | 19 July 1994 – 20 July 1999
| style="text-align:left; | 
|-
| style="text-align:left; | Bartho Pronk
| style="text-align:left; | Male
| style="text-align:left; |  Christian Democratic Appeal
| style="text-align:left; |  EPP
| style="text-align:left; | 20 November 1989 – 20 July 2004
| style="text-align:left; | 
|-
| style="text-align:left; | Maartje van Putten
| style="text-align:left; | Female
| style="text-align:left; |  Labour Party
| style="text-align:left; |  PES
| style="text-align:left; | 25 July 1989 – 20 July 1999
| style="text-align:left; | 
|-align=left
| Jim Janssen van Raaij
| Male
|  Christian Democratic Appeal
|  EPP
| 17 July 1979 – 24 July 1984October 1986 – 20 July 1999
| 
|-
| style="text-align:left; | Jan Sonneveld
| style="text-align:left; | Male
| style="text-align:left; |  Christian Democratic Appeal
| style="text-align:left; |  EPP
| style="text-align:left; | 25 July 1989 – 20 July 1999
| style="text-align:left; | 
|-
| style="text-align:left; | Wim van Velzen
| style="text-align:left; | Male
| style="text-align:left; |  Labour Party
| style="text-align:left; |  PES
| style="text-align:left; | 25 July 1989 – 20 July 1999
| style="text-align:left; | 
|-
| style="text-align:left; | Wim van Velzen
| style="text-align:left; | Male
| style="text-align:left; |  Christian Democratic Appeal
| style="text-align:left; |  EPP
| style="text-align:left; | 19 July 1994 – 20 July 2004
| style="text-align:left; | 
|-
| style="text-align:left; | Gijs de Vries
| style="text-align:left; | Male
| style="text-align:left; |  People's Party for Freedom and Democracy
| style="text-align:left; |  ELDR
| style="text-align:left; | 24 July 1984 – 2 August 1998
| style="text-align:left; | 
|-
| style="text-align:left; | Leen van der Waal
| style="text-align:left; | Male
| style="text-align:left; |  Reformed Political Party
| style="text-align:left; |  EN /I-EN
| style="text-align:left; | 24 July 1984 – 2 September 1997
| style="text-align:left; | 
|-
| style="text-align:left; | Jan-Kees Wiebenga
| style="text-align:left; | Male
| style="text-align:left; |  People's Party for Freedom and Democracy
| style="text-align:left; |  ELDR
| style="text-align:left; | 19 July 1994 – October 2001
| style="text-align:left; | 
|-
| style="text-align:left; | Jan Marinus Wiersma
| style="text-align:left; | Male
| style="text-align:left; |  Labour Party
| style="text-align:left; |  PES
| style="text-align:left; | 19 July 1994 – 14 July 2009
| style="text-align:left; | 
|-
| style="text-align:left; | Florus Wijsenbeek
| style="text-align:left; | Male
| style="text-align:left; |  People's Party for Freedom and Democracy
| style="text-align:left; |  ELDR
| style="text-align:left; | 24 July 1984 – 20 July 1999
| style="text-align:left; | 
|-style="background-color:#dcdcdc"
| style="text-align:left;" colspan="6" |Source:
|-
|}

By party

On the Christian Democratic Appeal list: (EPP)

 Hanja Maij-Weggen (top candidate)
 Peter Pex
 Wim van Velzen
 Bartho Pronk
 Arie Oostlander
 Jan Sonneveld
 Karla Peijs
 Ria Oomen-Ruijten
 Jim Janssen van Raaij
 Pam Cornelissen

On the Labour Party list: (PES)

 Piet Dankert
 Leonie van Bladel
 Jan Marinus Wiersma
 Frits Castricum
 Hedy d'Ancona (top candidate)
 Wim van Velzen
 Maartje van Putten
 Alman Metten

On the People's Party for Freedom and Democracy list: (ELDR)

 Jessica Larive
 Jan Mulder
 Elly Plooij-van Gorsel
 Gijs de Vries (top candidate) (replaced by: Robert Jan Goedbloed)
 Jan-Kees Wiebenga
 Florus Wijsenbeek
Robert Jan Goedbloed

On the Democrats 66 list: (ELDR)

 Jan-Willem Bertens (top candidate)
 Johanna Boogerd-Quaak
 Laurens Jan Brinkhorst
 Doeke Eisma

On the SGP, GPV and RPF list: (EN and I-EN)

 Hans Blokland (GPV)
 Leen van der Waal (SGP) (top candidate) (replaced by: Rijk van Dam)
 Rijk van Dam (RPF)

On the GreenLeft list: (G)

 Nel van Dijk (top candidate) (replaced by: Joost Lagendijk)
 Joost Lagendijk

Independent: (left their party delegation at some point during this European 2004–2009 session.)
 Jim Janssen van Raaij

References 

List
1994
Netherlands